The Europe/Africa Zone was one of the three zones of the regional Davis Cup competition in 1994.

In the Europe/Africa Zone there were three different tiers, called groups, in which teams competed against each other to advance to the upper tier. Winners in Group II advanced to the Europe/Africa Zone Group I. Teams who lost their respective ties competed in the relegation play-offs, with winning teams remaining in Group II, whereas teams who lost their play-offs were relegated to the Europe/Africa Zone Group III in 1995.

Participating nations

Draw

 and  promoted to Group I in 1995.

First round

Kenya vs. Latvia

Ireland vs. Ukraine

Morocco vs. Egypt

Poland vs. Bulgaria

Ghana vs. Monaco

Nigeria vs. Senegal

Slovenia vs. Greece

Finland vs. Estonia

Second round

Latvia vs. Ukraine

Poland vs. Morocco

Ghana vs. Nigeria

Slovenia vs. Finland

Relegation play-offs

Ireland vs. Kenya

Egypt vs. Bulgaria

Monaco vs. Senegal

Greece vs. Estonia

Third round

Latvia vs. Morocco

Ghana vs. Slovenia

References

External links
Davis Cup official website

Davis Cup Europe/Africa Zone
Europe Africa Zone Group II